Annica Birgitta Teres Svensson (born 3 March 1983) is a Swedish former football defender who last played in Sweden for Eskilstuna United DFF. She previously played for Tyresö FF, and spent the second half of the 2013 season on loan at Vittsjö GIK. She represented Sweden at the 2011 FIFA Women's World Cup and the 2012 London Olympics.

Career
A late bloomer, Svensson made her Sweden debut at the age of 27, in a 1–1 draw with United States on 30 July 2010.

Svensson played ten times for Sweden's national youth teams, with the last appearance in 2001. She was called into the senior national team two years after suffering an anterior cruciate ligament injury while captaining Hammarby IF DFF in the Damallsvenskan. National coach Thomas Dennerby valued the versatility of Svensson, who can function in the centre back or full back positions.

Tyresö won the Damallsvenskan title for the first time in the 2012 season and Svensson collected her first league winner's medal.

As ambitious Tyresö continued to strengthen their squad, Svensson lost her place in the team and was not called up to Sweden's UEFA Women's Euro 2013 selection. In August 2013 she went on loan to Damallsvenskan team Vittsjö GIK, in search of first team football. She signed for newly promoted Eskilstuna United DFF in January 2014, where she joined former Tyresö teammate Sara Thunebro.

In October 2018 Svensson officially ended her career.

Personal life

In December 2018 she married her former Eskilstuna team-mate Vaila Barsley.

Honours

Club 

 Djurgården/Älvsjö
 Damallsvenskan (2): 2003, 2004

References

External links
 
 Sweden player profile  at SvFF
 
 Tyresö FF player profile
 

1983 births
Living people
Swedish women's footballers
Sweden women's international footballers
2011 FIFA Women's World Cup players
Footballers at the 2012 Summer Olympics
Olympic footballers of Sweden
Tyresö FF players
Damallsvenskan players
Hammarby Fotboll (women) players
Vittsjö GIK players
Djurgårdens IF Fotboll (women) players
Eskilstuna United DFF players
Women's association football fullbacks
Lesbian sportswomen
LGBT association football players
Swedish LGBT sportspeople